The 2011 NAB Cup was the Australian Football League (AFL) pre-season competition played before the 2011 season. The games were played between 11 February and 11 March.

This was the first time since 2003 that the competition format had changed. With the introduction of the Gold Coast Football Club and Greater Western Sydney Giants (the latter required to make the competition feature a manageable 18 teams), the format for the 2011 NAB Cup was as follows:
Weeks 1 and 2: The eighteen teams are split into six pools of three teams each. The three teams in each pool play each other in games of two 20-minute halves, with all three games being played over a three-hour period at the one venue.
Week 3: The first ranked teams from each pool progress to the quarter-finals, with the two next best ranked teams joining them, allowing an eight team quarter-finals weekend.
Week 4: The winners from the quarter-finals progress to the semi-finals.
Week 5: The two winners of the semi-finals progress to the NAB Cup Grand Final.

Games
The first round fixtures were announced by the AFL on 26 October 2010.

Round 1

Round 2

Round 3

Grand Final

NAB Challenge
On 16 December 2010, the AFL announced the towns that will play host to the NAB Challenge competition. In week 1, the Adelaide suburb of Thebarton hosted an AFL pre-season game for the first time at Thebarton Oval where SANFL team Woodville-West Torrens plays. Traeger Park in Alice Springs, Manuka Oval, Visy Park and Skilled Stadium also hosted matches. Week 2 saw matches played at Lavington for the first time since 2006 as well as games at Southport, Bunbury, Shepparton, Visy Park and AAMI Stadium. In the final week of the competition, matches were played at Coffs Harbour, North Ballarat, Southport, Willaston near Gawler (SA), Fremantle, Aurora Stadium and Visy Park.

Report

See also
2011 AFL season

References

NAB Cup
Australian Football League pre-season competition